This is a list of Spanish television related events from 1968.

Events
 16 February Historia de la frivolidad wins Golden Nymph Award at the Monte-Carlo Television Festival.
 2 March Joan Manuel Serrat chosen to represent Spain in the Eurovision Song Contest. He is latter discarded as he tries to sing in catalan language.
6 April - Spain wins the 13th Eurovision Song Contest in London, United Kingdom. The winning song is "La, la, la", performed by Massiel.

Debuts
 La 1 

Television shows
 La 1 

Ending this year
 La 1 
 Ésta es su vida (1962-1968)
 Noche del sábado (1965-1968)
 Un tema para el debate (1965-1968)
 Biblioteca juvenil (1966-1968)
 Jardilín (1966-1968)
 La pequeña comedia (1966-1968)
 Historias naturales (1967-1968)
 Protagonista: El hombre (1967-1968)
 Tribuna TV (1967-1968)
 Vamos a la mesa (1967-1968)

 La 2 
 Luz verde'' (1966-1968)

Foreign series debuts in Spain

Births
 11 January - Alberto San Juan, actor.
 17 January - Antonio Molero, actor.
 20 January - Roberto Enríquez, actor.
 24 January - Mónica Molina, actress.
 28 January - Liborio García, presenter.
 5 February - Daniel de la Cámara, humorist.
 14 February - Alicia Borrachero, actress.
 29 March - Esther Arroyo, actress and hostess.
 13 March - Pepe Rodríguez, chef and presenter.
 12 May - Jaime Bores, presenter.
 20 March - Sonia Castelo, actress.
 11 June - Josep Tomás, presenter.
 18 June - Ana Duato, actress.
 8 July - Miguel Puga, mago and presenter.
 4 September - Yolanda Ramos, actress and hostess.
 13 September - Santi Millán, actor.
 4 October - Luis Miguel Seguí, actor.
 21 October - Yolanda Ventura, actress.
 5 November - Aitana Sánchez-Gijón, actress.
 30 November Llum Barrera, actress and hostess.
 9 December - Pedro García Aguado, presenter.
 18 December - Juan Carlos Ortega, humorist.
 23 December - Miquel Silvestre, journalist.
 Miguel Ángel Tobías, presenter.

Deaths
 March 18 - José Luis Ozores, actor, 45

See also
1968 in Spain
List of Spanish films of 1968

References